Rustaveli National Theatre is the largest and one of the oldest theaters of Georgia, located in its capital Tbilisi on Rustaveli Avenue. Housed in an ornate Rococo-style edifice, the theatre was founded in 1887 and since 1921 has carried the name of Georgia's national poet Rustaveli.

History and architecture
The building was founded in 1887 as an "Artists' Society". Upon request of the Artists' Society, several celebrated artists were commissioned to paint frescoes on the walls and ceilings of the basement. These artists included prominent Georgian painters Lado Gudiashvili and David Kakabadze, as well as theatre set designer Serge Sudeikin, who is known for his work for the Ballets Russes and the Metropolitan Opera. Two other important Georgian painters, Mose and Iracly Toidze, eventually joined the project as well. The masterpieces that once adorned the lower level of the Rustaveli Theatre were whitewashed during the period of Soviet rule and only a small portion of the frescoes has been restored.

In 1921 the building was renamed Rustaveli Theatre. Construction of the theatre was funded by Alexander Mantashev and it was designed by Cornell K. Tatishchev and Aleksander Szymkiewicz, Tbilisi's Municipal Architect.

From 2002 to 2005 the theatre underwent a thorough renovation, which was largely funded by Georgian businessman Bidzina Ivanishvili.

Performance facilities
The theatre is home to three stages including, the main stage (about 800 seats), the small stage (283 seats) and a Black Box Theatre (182 seats) for experimental performances. The theatre is also available for conferences and events and houses a large ballroom, a small ballroom and a small foyer.

Photo gallery

External links
Official site
Resources on Georgian Parliament website.

Cultural venues in Tbilisi
Rustaveli Avenue
Theatres in Georgia (country)
Tourist attractions in Tbilisi